Beta (uppercase , lowercase , or cursive ;  or ) is the second letter of the Greek alphabet. In the system of Greek numerals, it has a value of 2. In Ancient Greek, beta represented the voiced bilabial plosive . In Modern Greek, it represents the voiced labiodental fricative  while  in borrowed words is instead commonly transcribed as μπ.

Name
Like the names of most other Greek letters, the name of beta was adopted from the acrophonic name of the corresponding letter in Phoenician, which was the common Semitic word *bait ('house'). In Greek, the name was  bêta, pronounced  in Ancient Greek. It is spelled βήτα in modern monotonic orthography and pronounced .

History

The letter beta was derived from the Phoenician letter beth .

Uses

Algebraic numerals
In the system of Greek numerals, beta has a value of 2. Such use is denoted by a number mark: Β′.

Computing

Finance
Beta is used in finance as a measure of (historical; pseudo-implied) financial asset sensitivity to the relevant benchmark index. Conditional on the benchmark index, the resulting beta value can vary considerably (S&P500 vs NASDAQ vs ETF of a specific industry).

Beta should not to be confused with standard deviation (or the semi-variance, which considers only negative returns): the preferred measure of the "riskiness" (historical volatility of returns) of a financial asset or a portfolio in isolation.

Beta can be calculated as the covariance of a financial asset (or portfolio) with its benchmark index, divided by the variance of the benchmark index. 
Since the industry of finance gravitates towards return generating activities, typically the historical returns (percentage changes) are used in the calculations Beta values (among others).
There are numerous other methods a financial analyst can employ to derive Beta values if historical prices are not available.
Beta values change over time (company restructuring; industry sentiment; endo/exogenous factors).  Beta values also vary, conditional on the time period used in calculating a Beta value. 
Beta values can be negative, which infers the existence of financial assets which historically, tended to move in opposite directions to one another by some unit value.  
It would seem these are the optimal "hedges" to offset market-draw-downs, during periods of market-stress and poor liquidity Beta values can vary dramatically, and previously low or even negative correlations converge to "1".

A beta of 1.5 implies that for every 1% change in the value of the benchmark index, the portfolio's value tends to change by 1.5%.
The greater the absolute value, the greater the implied move.

International Phonetic Alphabet
In the International Phonetic Alphabet, Greek minuscule beta denotes a voiced bilabial fricative .

A superscript version may also indicate a compressed vowel, like .

Meteorology
Beta has twice been used to name an Atlantic Basin tropical cyclone:
 Hurricane Beta, in 2005
 Tropical Storm Beta, in 2020

Mathematics and science
Beta is often used to denote a variable in mathematics and physics, where it often has specific meanings for certain applications. In physics a stream of unbound energetic electrons is commonly referred to as beta radiation or beta rays. Decays producing electrons or their antiparticles are called beta decays. In regression analysis,  symbolizes nonstandardized partial slope coefficients, whereas  represents standardized (standard deviation-score form) coefficients; in both cases, the coefficients reflect the change in the criterion Y per one-unit change in the value of the associated predictor X. β is also used in biology, for instance in β-Carotene, a primary source of provitamin A, or the β cells in pancreatic islets, which produce insulin.

β is sometimes used as a placeholder for an ordinal number if α is already used.

In spaceflight, beta angle describes the angle between the orbit plane of a spacecraft or other body and the vector from the sun.

β is sometimes used to mean the proton-to-electron mass ratio.

Rock climbing terminology
The term "beta" refers to advice on how to successfully complete a particular climbing route, boulder problem, or crux sequence.

Slang 

Beta male, or simply beta, is a slang term for men derived from the designation for beta animals in ethology, along with its counterpart, alpha male. The term has been used as a pejorative self-identifier among members of manosphere communities, particularly incels, who do not believe they are assertive or traditionally masculine, and feel overlooked by women. It is also used to negatively describe other men who are not assertive, particularly in heterosexual relationships.

Statistics 
In statistics, beta may represent type II error, or regression slope.

Typography
In some high-quality typesetting, especially in the French tradition, a typographic variant of the lowercase letter without a descender is used within a word for ancient Greek:  is printed .

In typesetting technical literature, it is a commonly made mistake to use the German letter ß (a s–z or s–s ligature) as a replacement for β. The two letters resemble each other in some fonts, but they are unrelated.

Videotape formats
"Beta" can be used to refer to several consumer and professional videotape formats developed by Japan's Sony Corporation. Although similarly named, they are very different in function and obsolescence.
 Betamax was the name of a domestic videotape format developed in the 1970s and 1980s. It competed with the Video Home System (VHS) format developed by the Japanese Victor Company, to which it eventually succumbed. The Betamax format was also marketed Betacord by (Sanyo); some cassettes were simply labeled "Beta", and the logo was a lower-case beta. Betamax lost in the market and is an oft-used example of a technically superior solution that failed due to market forces.
 Betacam, including Beta SP and DigiBeta, is a family of professional videotape formats launched in 1982 that was the de facto standard for professional video, advertising, and television production through the 2000s. The formats outlasted analog NTSC television, and their scarcity today is because the industry has moved to HD formats.

Character encodings 

 Greek Beta

 Coptic Vida

 Latin Beta

 Mathematical Beta

These characters are used only as mathematical symbols. Stylized Greek text should be encoded using the normal Greek letters, with markup and formatting to indicate text style.

References

Greek letters
Phonetic transcription symbols